Joseph Dickson (born July 13, 1989) is an American football linebacker for the BC Lions of the Canadian Football League (CFL). He was signed by the Jacksonville Jaguars as an undrafted free agent in 2011. He played college football at Idaho.

He has also been a member of the Cleveland Browns, Omaha Nighthawks, New York Jets, Arizona Cardinals, and Omaha Mammoths.

Professional career

Jacksonville Jaguars
Dickson signed with the Jacksonville Jaguars following the 2011 NFL Draft as a rookie free agent.  He was waived on July 31, 2011, to make room for punter Matt Turk.  He was signed on April 16, 2012. He was waived on April 27, 2012.

Cleveland Browns
The Cleveland Browns signed him on May 14, 2012, but waived him on August 26, 2012.

Omaha Nighthawks
In 2012, he went to training camp with the Omaha Nighthawks.

New York Jets
Dickson was signed to the New York Jets' practice squad on December 10, 2012. He was signed to a future/reserve contract on December 31, 2012. He was released on August 31, 2013.

Arizona Cardinals
Dickson later signed with the Arizona Cardinals practice squad, being released on December 23, 2013. He was signed to a future contract for 2014 by the Arizona Cardinals on January 16, 2014. The Cardinals released Dickson again on August 25, 2014.

Kansas City Chiefs
Dickson signed with the Kansas City Chiefs on December 30, 2014.

BC Lions 
On September 1, 2015, Dickson signed with the BC Lions

References

External links
 New York Jets bio
 Idaho Vandals bio
 Just Sports Stats

1989 births
Living people
American football middle linebackers
Idaho Vandals football players
Cleveland Browns players
Jacksonville Jaguars players
Omaha Nighthawks players
New York Jets players
People from Maui County, Hawaii
Players of American football from Hawaii
Omaha Mammoths players